Veliki Bukovec, Krapina-Zagorje County  is a village in Croatia. 

Populated places in Krapina-Zagorje County